WSX may refer to:

 Wrestling Society X, a short-lived professional wrestling television series that was broadcast on MTV in 2007
 Westsound/WSX Seaplane Base, a seaplane base with IATA code WSX
 FS-A1WSX, a home computer
 Interleukin-27 receptor, a cell receptor